Cameron "Cam" Jurgens (born August 21, 1999) is an American football center for the Philadelphia Eagles of the National Football League (NFL). He played college football at Nebraska.

Early life and high school
Jurgens grew up in Pickrell, Nebraska and attended Beatrice High School. He played tight end, fullback, linebacker, and punter on the football team and also played basketball and threw discus and shot put on the track team.

College career
Jurgens began his freshman season at tight end and appeared in one game before suffering a foot injury and redshirting the rest of the season. After recovering from his injury, he began to practice at the interior offensive line. Jurgens ultimately moved to the center position and was named the Cornhuskers starter going into his redshirt freshman season. He started all 12 of Nebraska's games and was the first freshman to start at center for the team since NCAA restored freshmen eligibility in 1972. Jurgens started seven of Nebraska's eight games in the team's COVID-19-shortened 2020 season. As a redshirt junior, he started all 12 of the Cornhusker's games and was named third-team All-Big Ten Conference by the leagues coaches. Following the end of the season, Jurgens declared that he would forgo his redshirt senior season and enter the 2022 NFL draft.

Jurgens also competed on Nebraska's track and field team in shot put for two seasons.

Professional career

Jurgens was drafted by the Philadelphia Eagles in the second round (51st overall) of the 2022 NFL Draft.

Personal life
Jurgens has his own line of beef jerky called Beef Jurgy.

References

External links
 Philadelphia Eagles bio
Nebraska Cornhuskers football bio
Nebraska Cornhuskers track and field bio

Living people
American football centers
Nebraska Cornhuskers football players
Nebraska Cornhuskers men's track and field athletes
Players of American football from Nebraska
People from Beatrice, Nebraska
1999 births
Philadelphia Eagles players